Sammarco is a surname. Notable people with the surname include:

Gian Sammarco (born 1970), English former child actor and nurse
Mario Sammarco, Italian operatic baritone
Paolo Sammarco (born 1983), Italian soccer player
Paolo Emilio Sammarco (died 1610), Italian Roman Catholic bishop